Statistics of Hong Kong Third Division League in the 1935/1936 season.

Overview
Eastern Lancashire Regiment won the championship.

League table

References
RSSSF

3
Hong Kong Third Division League seasons
1935–36 in Asian association football leagues